Rifkhan Mohamed (born 25 October 1999) is a Sri-Lankan footballer who plays as a striker for Defenders Football Club of the Sri Lanka Champions League, and the Sri Lanka national football team.

Club career
Mohamed began playing for Sri Lanka Police SC of the Sri Lanka Champions League in 2018. In late 2020 he moved to league rivals Defenders Football Club with the official announcement coming in February 2021.

International career
Mohamed represented Sri Lanka at the youth level in 2018 AFC U-19 Championship qualification and 2020 AFC U-23 Championship qualification.  He made his senior debut on 12 October 2018 in a 1–4 friendly defeat to Malaysia. In 2021 he was called up to the senior squad again for 2022 FIFA World Cup qualification and the SAFF Championship.

International career statistics

References

External links
 
 
 
 AFC profile

1999 births
Living people
Sri Lankan footballers
Association football forwards
Sri Lanka youth international footballers
Sri Lanka international footballers